Klaus Schrodt (born 14 September 1946 in Dieburg, Hessen) is a German aviator who formerly raced in the Red Bull Air Race World Series.  Before joining the series, Schrodt was an airline pilot and yachtsman.

Whilst being passionate for yachting in his youth, Schrodt maintained a strong interest in flying, travelling  each day in order to clean hangars in exchange for 10 minutes of flying lessons.  After completing flight school, he became a pilot for Lufthansa at 19 years old; Schrodt retired in 2002 to focus on aerobatic flying.  Schrodt's aviation career has seen him take the German Aerobatic Championship five times, as well as the 2001 and 2005 Freestyle World Aerobatic Championship and the 2002 and 2004 Freestyle European Championships.  Klaus has flown over 100 different aircraft, notching up more than 22,000 flying hours.

His interest in yachting led to crossing the Atlantic ocean on three separate solo trips, the first of which was in 1976.

Legend:
 CAN: Cancelled
 DNP: Did not participate
 DNS: Did not show
 DQ: Disqualified
 NC: Not classified

References

External links
Red Bull Air Race World Series Profile
Red Bull Air Race World Series official website

1946 births
Living people
People from Dieburg
Sportspeople from Darmstadt (region)
Aerobatic pilots
German air racers
Red Bull Air Race World Championship pilots
Commercial aviators
Lufthansa people